Henry Mordaunt, 4th Baron Mordaunt (died 1608) was an English landowner involved in the Gunpowder Plot.

He was the son of Lewis Mordaunt, 3rd Baron Mordaunt and Elizabeth Darcy. The family house was Drayton House.

Mordaunt was at Apethorpe with a welcoming party for James VI and I in April 1603. While he was there he discussed plans to cut timber in Brigstock park. There were riots at Brigstock in May and Mordaunt went to read a royal proclamation to restore order. Francis Tresham, later a Gunpowder plot conspirator, was involved in the controversy at Brigstock.

He entertained King James and Anne of Denmark at his house at Drayton, Northamptonshire, with musicians and singers in August 1605. The queen's secretary, William Fowler, was also present.

Mordaunt was imprisoned in the Tower of London on suspicion of complicity in the Gunpowder Plot, for his correspondence with Everard Digby. He was released on 3 June 1606.

He died in 1608.

Marriage and family
He married Margaret Compton, a daughter of Henry Compton, 1st Baron Compton. Their children included:
 John Mordaunt, 1st Earl of Peterborough

References

1608 deaths
People associated with the Gunpowder Plot
Peers of England
4